Back It Up is a 1983 studio album by Robin Trower, and the last to feature James Dewar.  It was after this album was released that Trower was dropped by Chrysalis Records because he did not tour to support the album, in addition to the album's lack of radio airplay.

Track listing

Side one
 "Back It Up" (Robin Trower, Reg Webb) – 3:54
 "River" (Robin Trower, James Dewar) – 3:51
 "Black to Red" (Robin Trower) – 2:56
 "Benny Dancer" (Robin Trower, James Dewar) – 8:52

Side two
 "Time Is Short" (Robin Trower) – 3:40
 "Islands"  (Robin Trower) – 4:04
 "None But the Brave" (Robin Trower, Keith Reid) – 2:36
 "Captain Midnight" (Robin Trower, James Dewar) – 3:09
 "Settling the Score" (Robin Trower, Keith Reid) – 5:16

Personnel 
 Robin Trower - guitar, producer
 James Dewar - bass (tracks 1 and 6), vocals
 Dave Bronze - bass (tracks 2-5, 7-9)
 Alan Clarke - drums (tracks 1 and 6)
 Bob Clouter - drums (tracks 2-5, 7-9)
 Jon Walls - recording engineer, mix engineer

References

1983 albums
Robin Trower albums
Chrysalis Records albums